Snowcross may refer to:

Snowboard Cross, a type of snowboard racing where a group of people race to cross the finish line first
Snocross, a type of cross country snowmobile racing on a short track